Argumentation and Advocacy is a quarterly peer-reviewed academic journal published by Taylor & Francis, edited by Beth Innocenti of University of Kansas. The journal was previously edited by Katherine Langford, Harry Weger, Catherine H. Palczewski, and John Fritch.

Aims and scope
The journal's focus is on moving the study of argumentation forward, including articles which are theoretical and critical in the broad subject areas of argumentation theory, public argument, critical and cultural perspectives, and forensics and pedagogy. The journal includes reviews of pertinent books. It includes the arts and sciences of civil debate, dialogue, conversation, and persuasion. It covers studies of rules of inference, logic, and procedural rules in both artificial and real world settings. This includes debate and negotiation, which are concerned with reaching mutually acceptable conclusions.

Abstracting and indexing
The journal is abstracted and indexed in:
ProQuest International Academic Research Library, Humanities
Infonautics Information Services
Communication and Mass Media Complete, EBSCO Information Services
UnCover Information Services
Online Index of Forensic Research, The Minnesota State University-Mankato

References

External links
Official website
Submit an article
Journal information
Subscribe to the journal

Publications established in 1964
Quarterly journals
English-language journals
Debating